George School of Law is a self-financed college of legal education at Konnagar, Hooghly district in the state of West Bengal, India. It was established in 2012. This college is affiliated to University of Calcutta. It is situated beside the Grand Trunk Road at Konnagar.

Course
The institute offers a 3 year LL.B course approved by Burdwan University and five-year integrated Bachelor of Laws (B.A./LL.B) course approved by the Calcutta University as well as the Higher Education Department, West Bengal. This degree is Recognized by Bar Council of India, New Delhi.

See also 
List of colleges affiliated to the University of Calcutta
Education in India
Education in West Bengal

References

External links

Law schools in West Bengal
Universities and colleges in Hooghly district
2012 establishments in West Bengal
Educational institutions established in 2012